The 2025 Rugby League World Cup will be the seventeenth staging of the Rugby League World Cup and will be held in France in October and November 2025. Beyond the Rugby League World Cup, there will be several other separate World Cups under the tournament umbrella, including the women's, wheelchair and youth competitions. There will be 16 teams playing in the men's, as well as 16 teams playing in the women's, youth (Under-19 men) and wheelchair umbrella competitions.

Host selection

After the U.S. lost the 2021 Rugby League World Cup bid to England, the Rugby League International Federation (RLIF) recommended that the United States and Canada should host the 2025 event after an impressive bid by Moore Sports International.  The RLIF Congress reviewed that recommendation at a meeting in November 2016. 
On 20 November, it was announced that the North America bid had won the rights to host the 2025 World Cup. This would have been the first time the tournament was held outside of Europe and Oceania.

On 4 December 2018, plans for the World Cup to be held in North America were scrapped due to financial concerns and that the location of the 2025 Rugby League World Cup would be determined by a new bidding process in 2019.

In March 2021, it was reported that France is the preferred destination for the 2025 Rugby League World Cup. France officially lodged a bid later that year, in July.

In January 2022, France won the bid to host the world cup. The official announcement announcing France as the host nation was made on 11 January 2022 by French prime minister, Jean Castex.  It is intended that the tournament will be played at 40 cities across France during October and November 2025.

Qualification

Venues 
38 cities have bid to host matches of the four major tournament of the World Cup. These are:

Albi, Arras, Autun, Beauvais, Blagnac, Begles, Besancon, Biganos, Bordeaux, Boulazac, Carcassonne, Chambery, Chatillon, Issoire, Le Creusot, Le Mans, Libourne, Limoges, Limoux, Lourdes, Marmande-Tonneins, Martigues, Massy, Montauban, Montlucon; Narbonne, Nice, Paris, Periguex, Perpignan, Pia, Roanne, Salon-de-Provence, Toulouse, Trelissac, Vannes, Vichy, Villefrance-de-Rouergue, Villeneuve-sur-Lot.

It is expected that Paris, Toulouse and Marseille will host the final and semi-finals of the men's tournament.

Competitions
Seeing an increase from three in 2021, the 2025 World Cup alongside the primary have three other tournaments occurring simultaneously. Alongside the men's 2025 Rugby League World Cup sits the women's, wheelchair and youth world cups.

Notes

References

External links
 https://www.france2025.com/fr/
 https://twitter.com/CDMFrance2025

 
2025 in rugby league
Rugby League World Cup
International rugby league competitions hosted by France 
World Cup 2025